Roger Georges Chesneau (3 July 1925 – 6 February 2012) was a French steeplechaser who competed in the 1948 Summer Olympics. He died in February 2012 at the age of 86.

References

1925 births
2012 deaths
French male steeplechase runners
Olympic athletes of France
Athletes (track and field) at the 1948 Summer Olympics